This is a list of films which have placed number one at the weekend box office in Colombia during 2016.

Films

References

2016
2016 in Colombia
Colombia